René Bach (born 7 June 1990, in Hjordkær, Rødekro) is a motorcycle speedway rider from Denmark.

Career
He was a member of the Denmark U-21 national team.

Results

World Championships 
 Individual U-21 World Championship
 2009 - 11th place in Qualifying Round 5
 Team U-21 World Championship (Under-21 Speedway World Cup)
 2008 -  Holsted - Runner-up (6 pts)
 2009 -  Gorzów Wlkp. - Runner-up (7 pts)
 2010 -  Rye House - Under-21 World Champion (15 pts)

European Championships 
 Individual U-19 European Championship
 2008 - track reserve at Semi-Final 2
 2009 -  Tarnów - 15th place (2 pts)
 Team U-19 European Championship
 2009 -  Holsted - 3rd place (9 pts)

Domestic competitions 
 Team Polish Championship
 2008 - 4th place in Second League (Average 0.800 in 5 heats) for Łódź
 2009 - Second League for Piła

See also 
 Denmark national speedway team

References 

1990 births
Living people
Danish speedway riders
Team Speedway Junior World Champions
People from Aabenraa Municipality
Sportspeople from the Region of Southern Denmark